Hiremalligawad is a village in Dharwad district of Karnataka, India.

Demographics 
As of the 2011 Census of India there were 249 households in Hiremalligawad and a total population of 1,236 consisting of 621 males and 615 females. There were 162 children ages 0-6.

References

Villages in Dharwad district